Babette Bomberling is a 1927 German silent comedy film directed by Victor Janson and starring Xenia Desni, Karl Elzer and Ferdinand Hart.

The film's art direction was by Jacek Rotmil.

Cast

References

Bibliography

External links

1927 films
1927 comedy films
German comedy films
Films of the Weimar Republic
German silent feature films
Films directed by Victor Janson
National Film films
German black-and-white films
Silent comedy films
1920s German films
1920s German-language films